Crookhill is an area of Ryton in Tyne and Wear, England. The original terraced housing was built mostly as accommodation for NCB workers, and lies to the east of the centre of Ryton, approx 6 miles west of Newcastle upon Tyne.

Notable people

Billy Ayre, former professional football player and manager

External links
Crookhill Primary School website

Populated places in Tyne and Wear
Ryton, Tyne and Wear